Danish withdrawal from the European Union (colloquially Dexit or Danexit, a portmanteau of "Danish" and "exit") is the hypothesis that Denmark might leave the European Union (EU). Leaving the EU is officially  supported by just two of the political parties represented in the Danish Parliament, with less than 8% of the total seats.

Background 

In June 2016, the United Kingdom voted to leave the EU. Eurosceptics elsewhere in the EU were encouraged by this decision, although its consequences had yet to emerge. 

In 2016, Kristian Thulesen Dahl, then leader of the Danish People's Party (DPP), said that he wanted a referendum on whether Denmark should leave the EU.

In 2020, Morten Messerschmidt, leader of the DPP since 2022, said that his country might leave the European Union within the next few years due to what he believed would be "the success of Brexit".

Political positions 

As of 2022, membership of the European Union has broad support across the Danish political spectrum, including from the governing Social Democratic Party and the main opposition Venstre. The right-wing DPP and the Nye Borgerlige party support leaving the EU, with only the latter current advocating for a referendum on EU membership. Together, the two parties hold 10 of the 179 seats in the Danish parliament (as of July 2022).

Although historically eurosceptic, the left-wing Unity List dropped its policy of supporting a membership referendum in 2019 as a result of the troubled Brexit negotiations. It now advocates for reform of EU policies. In 2022 it removed the wish to leave the EU from their manifesto and instead describing a "perspective" to leave the EU. This was not without controversy within the party.

The classical liberal and libertarian Liberal Alliance tends to favour radically reforming and rolling back powers of the EU to protect Danish sovereignty, but individual politicians within the party and its youth branch at times but not any more endorse a complete withdrawal with some arguing that Denmark should leave the EU while maintaining single-market access.

History 
Denmark has been a member of the EU since 1973 and a majority support continued Danish membership of the EU. Greenland, after establishing home rule in 1979, voted to leave the European Communities in 1982 while remaining a country of the Kingdom of Denmark. Denmark has twice voted against closer union: in 1992, the Danes voted against ratification of the Treaty of Maastricht, but approved it after the Danish Government renegotiated its terms to secure Danish opt-outs from some of its provisions;  in 2000 in another referendum, Denmark decided by a small majority not to join the euro, but since then, the Danmarks Nationalbank has maintained a fixed exchange rate between the Danish krone and the euro.

Public opinion

See also 

 Currency board
 Interpretation of EU Treaty law by European Court of Justice
 Multi-speed Europe
 Referendums related to the European Union
 Withdrawal of Greenland from the European Communities

References 

Politics of Denmark
Portmanteaus
Denmark and the European Union
Referendums in Denmark
Withdrawal from the European Union
Public policy proposals